Edel Mary Quinn, (14 September 1907 – 12 May 1944) known as Edel Quinn was an Irish-born Roman Catholic lay-missionary and Envoy of the Legion of Mary to East Africa.

Life
Born in Kanturk, County Cork, Edel Mary Quinn was the eldest child of bank official Charles Quinn and Louisa Burke Browne of County Clare.  She was a great-granddaughter of William Quinn, a native of Tyrone who settled in Tuam to build St. Mary's Cathedral. The spelling of her name was inspired by the edelweiss flower. Her parents had intended to name her Adele but the priest who baptized her thought they meant to call her after the flower and baptized her Edelweiss, which was shortened to Edel. 

During her childhood, her father's career brought the family to various towns in Ireland, including Tralee, Co. Kerry, where a plaque was unveiled in May 2009 at Bank Of Ireland House in Denny Street commemorating her residence there between 1921 and 1924. Quinn attended the Presentation Convent in the town between 1921-1925. 

Quinn felt a call to religious life at a young age.  She wished to join the Poor Clares but was prevented by advanced tuberculosis.  After spending eighteen months in a sanatorium, her condition unchanged, she decided to become active in the Legion of Mary, which she joined in Dublin at age 20.  She gave herself completely to its work in the form of helping the poor in the slums of a place called Dublin.

In 1936, at age 29 and dying of tuberculosis, Quinn became a Legion of Mary Envoy, a very active missionary to East and Central Africa, departing in December 1936 for Mombasa. Quinn settled in Nairobi having been told by Bishop Heffernan that this was the most convenient base for her work. By the outbreak of World War II, she was working as far off as Dar es Salaam and Mauritius.  In 1941, she was admitted to a sanatorium near Johannesburg. Fighting her illness, in seven and a half years she established hundreds of Legion branches and councils in today's Tanzania, Kenya, Uganda, Malawi, and Mauritius.  J.J. McCarthy, later Bishop of Zanzibar and Archbishop of Nairobi, wrote of her:

 "Miss Quinn is an extraordinary individual; courageous, zealous and optimistic. She wanders around in a dilapidated Ford, having for sole companion an African driver. When she returns home she will be qualified to speak about the Missions and Missionaries, having really more experience than any single Missionary I know."

All this time her health was never good, and in 1943 she took a turn for the worse, dying in Nairobi, Kenya of tuberculosis on 12 May 1944. She is buried there in the Missionaries' Cemetery.

Cause of beatification and canonization
The cause for her beatification was introduced in 1957.  She was declared venerable by Pope John Paul II on 15 December 1994, since when the campaign for her beatification has continued.

Notes

References
 Edel Quinn, Envoy of the Legion of Mary to Africa, Cardinal Suenens, (1952).
 The Tuam Journal, 2007.
 "Edel Quinn Commemoration" in Kerry Magazine, Issue 20 (2010), p. 46.
 "Edel Quinn's Kilmihil Connections" on pp. 95–6 of Parish of Kilmihil: Historical, Cultural & Sporting Achievements (2nd ed. 1987).
 History of the O'Gradys of Clare and Limerick, Gerard Madden, East Clare Heritage (2007), pp. 163–6.

Another biography of Edel Quinn has been written by the Irish priest and historian Fr. Desmond Forristal.

External links
Center for the Promotion of Legion of Mary Saints
Official Web Site for the Legion of Mary
Legion of Mary in Uganda
Edel Quinn
Edel Quinn Spanish Web Site
Quinn family in 1901 census (Edel's full name appears to be Edelweiss on the manuscript return, mistranscribed as Edluariss.)

People from County Cork
1907 births
1944 deaths
Venerated Catholics by Pope John Paul II
Irish Roman Catholic missionaries
Female Roman Catholic missionaries
20th-century venerated Christians
20th-century deaths from tuberculosis
Tuberculosis deaths in Kenya
Roman Catholic missionaries in Tanzania
Roman Catholic missionaries in Kenya
Roman Catholic missionaries in Uganda
Roman Catholic missionaries in Mauritius
Roman Catholic missionaries in Malawi
Irish expatriates in Kenya